Homer is a crater on Mercury.  It is one of 110 peak ring basins on Mercury.

Deposits of material in and around this crater suggest the possibility of explosive volcanic eruptions at some point in the planet's history.  An unnamed crater in northwestern Homer (about 18 km diameter) contains hollows and has dark ejecta.

The crater name was approved by the IAU in 1976. The naming of Stark Y crater on the moon, located northwest of Stark, as Homer, was not approved by the IAU.

The small but fresh crater Dominici lies along the northern margin of Homer.  The crater Handel is to the northeast, and Titian is to the southwest.

References

Impact craters on Mercury